Group D was one of four groups of nations competing at the 2011 AFC Asian Cup. The group's first round of matches were played on 11 January and its last matches were played on 19 January. All six group matches were played at venues in Doha and Al Rayyan, Qatar. The group consists of defending champions Iraq, 2010 AFC Challenge Cup champions North Korea, Iran and the United Arab Emirates.

Standings

All times are UTC+3.

North Korea vs UAE

Iraq vs Iran

Iran vs North Korea

UAE vs Iraq

Iraq vs North Korea

UAE vs Iran

Notes

External links
AFC Asian Cup 2011 Official Site

Group
2010–11 in Emirati football
2010–11 in Iranian football
2010–11 in Iraqi football
2011 in North Korean football